In ancient Egypt, Shait was the first season of year, beginning in the month of June. It was the Season of the Inundation, or flooding. The snow on the mountains in Africa melted and ran down the mountains, into the Nile. The waters of the Nile flowed on into Egypt, flooded the land and made it fertile.

Egyptian calendar